Cornus mas, commonly known as cornel (also the Cornelian cherry, European cornel or Cornelian cherry dogwood), is a species of shrub or small tree in the dogwood family Cornaceae native to Western Europe, Southern Europe, and Southwestern Asia.

Description
It is a medium to large deciduous shrub or small tree growing to 5–12 m tall, with dark brown branches and greenish twigs. The leaves are opposite, 4–10 cm long and 2–4 cm broad, with an ovate to oblong shape and an entire margin. The flowers are small (5–10 mm in diameter), with four yellow petals, produced in clusters of 10–25 together in the late winter (between February and March in the UK), well before the leaves appear. The fruit is an oblong red drupe 2 cm long and 1.5 cm in diameter, containing a single seed.

Uses

Fruit 

The fruits are red berries. When ripe on the plant, they bear a resemblance to coffee berries, and ripen in mid- to late summer. The fruit is edible and widely popular in Iran, where it is believed to have various medicinal properties and deliver health benefits. It is also used in  Eastern Europe, the UK, and British Columbia, Canada, but the unripe fruit is astringent. When ripe, the fruit is dark ruby red or a bright yellow. It has an acidic flavor which is best described as a mixture of cranberry and sour cherry; it is mainly used for making jam. It is also widely used in Azerbaijan to make pickles, add to rice, or make drinks.  In Armenia, Cornus berries are used to make vodka.

Flowers 

The species is also grown as an ornamental plant for its late winter yellow flowers, which open earlier than those of Forsythia. While Cornus mas flowers are not as large and vibrant as those of the Forsythia, the entire plant can be used for a similar effect in the landscape.

Wood 
The wood of C. mas is extremely dense and, unlike the wood of most other woody plant species, sinks in water. This density makes it valuable for crafting into tool handles, parts for machines, etc.

Cornus mas was used from the seventh century BCE onward by Greek craftsmen to construct spears, javelins and bows, the craftsmen considering it far superior to any other wood. The wood's association with weaponry was so well known that the Greek name for it was used as a synonym for "spear" in poetry during the fourth and third centuries BCE.

Leaves
The leaves (and fruit) are used in traditional medicine in Central and Southwest Asia.

Name
Cornus mas, "male" cornel, was named so to distinguish it from the true dogberry, the "female" cornel, Cornus sanguinea, and so it appears in John Gerard's Herbal:

Garden history
The shrub was not native to the British Isles. William Turner had only heard of the plant in 1548, but by 1551 he had heard of one at Hampton Court Palace. Gerard said it was to be found in the gardens "of such as love rare and dainty plants".

The appreciation of the early acid-yellow flowers is largely a 20th-century development.

Cultivars
The following cultivars have gained the Royal Horticultural Society’s Award of Garden Merit (confirmed 2017): 
’Aurea’ (yellow leaves and flowers, red fruit)
'Golden Glory' (profuse yellow flowers, shiny red berries)
’Variegata’ (variegated leaves, glossy red fruit)

References

External links
 
 

mas
Edible fruits
Flora of Europe
Flora of Asia
Plants described in 1753
Taxa named by Carl Linnaeus